Næste Stop Paradis or Next Stop Paradise is a 1980 Danish romantic drama film directed and written by Jon Bang Carlsen. The film stars Karen Lykkehus.

Cast
Karen Lykkehus as Dagmar Larsen 
Preben Lerdorff Rye as Hjalmar Krog 
Suzette Kempf as Dagmar som ung 
Jessie Rindom as Ellen 
Knud Lang as Ejnar Thomsen 
Ole Larsen as Frederiksen 
Ingolf David as Cirkusdirektør 
Inger Stender as Oversygeplejerske 
Peter Boesen as Dagmars afdøde mand - Togfører Kurt Larsen 
Otto Brandenburg as Dagmars søn John 
Kirsten Hansen-Møller as Johns kone 
Pouel Kern as Mand på kirkegård 
Valdemar Brodthagen as Baden 
Rene van Erp as Martin 
Bent Samuelsen as Dværgen Orlando 
Erik Louring as Døvstum 
Egon Aagaard as Harmonikaspiller 
Hilma Egeskov   
Helmut Friis   
Henning Hansen as Sanger 
Muzaffer Yildirim as Buschauffør 
Hilda Olsen   
Eva Hodell

References

External links
 

1980s Danish-language films
1980 films
1980 romantic drama films
Danish romantic drama films